Nadja Pries (born 20 May 1994) is a German BMX racer, representing her nation in international competitions. She competed in the time trial event and race event at the 2015 UCI BMX World Championships.

Pries was selected as part of the German cycling team for the 2016 Summer Olympics in Rio de Janeiro, competing in the women's BMX race. After she grabbed a fourteenth seed on the opening round with a time of 37.152, Pries scored a total of 19 placing points to take the penultimate spot against seven other racers in her semifinal heat, thus eliminating her from the tournament.

References

External links
 
 
 
 
 

1994 births
Living people
BMX riders
German female cyclists
Olympic cyclists of Germany
Cyclists at the 2016 Summer Olympics
European Games competitors for Germany
Cyclists at the 2015 European Games
Sportspeople from Erlangen
Cyclists from Bavaria
20th-century German women
21st-century German women